Yesaul Sergey Shivtzov (3 October 1874 – 17 March 1915) was an officer in the Imperial Russian Army who commanded the 1st Squadron of the 1st Orenburg Cossacks Cavalry Regiment during the World War I. He died leading the charge into battle of Khotyn against the Austro-Hungarian Army. Sergey Shivtzov' was the only son of a cavalry officer and Ataman of stanitsa Vozdvízhenskaya Ivan I. Shivtzov, a member of a Shivtzov Family.

References

1874 births
1915 deaths
Recipients of the Order of St. Anna, 2nd class
Recipients of the Gold Sword for Bravery
Russian military personnel of the Russo-Japanese War
Russian military personnel killed in World War I